Mihnea Popa (born 11 August 1973) is a Romanian-American mathematician at Harvard University, specializing in algebraic geometry.  He is known for his work on complex birational geometry, Hodge theory, abelian varieties, and vector bundles.

Academic career 
Popa received his bachelor's degree in 1996 from the University of Bucharest. He studied mathematics at the University of California, Los Angeles from 1996 to 1997, and then in 2001 he received his Ph.D. from the University of Michigan under the supervision of Robert Lazarsfeld. His thesis was titled Linear Series on Moduli Spaces of Vector Bundles on Curves. From 2001 to 2005, Popa was a Benjamin Peirce Assistant Professor at Harvard University and from 2005 to 2007 an assistant professor at the University of Chicago. He joined the University of Illinois at Chicago as an associate professor in 2007 and became a full professor in 2011. In 2014 he moved to Northwestern University, and in 2020 he became a professor at Harvard University.

Awards and honors 
Popa is an honorary member of the Institute of Mathematics of the Romanian Academy. He was an AMS Centennial Fellow in 2005–2007, a Sloan Research Fellow in 2007–2009, and a Simons Fellow in 2015–2016. In 2015 he became a fellow of the American Mathematical Society. In 2018 he was an Invited Speaker at the International Congress of Mathematicians  in Rio de Janeiro.

Selected publications
 

 Positivity for Hodge modules and geometric applications, in Proceedings of Symposia in Pure Mathematics, Vol. 97, Part I, Algebraic Geometry: Salt Lake City 2015, pp. 555–584.

References

External links
 Homepage
 

1973 births
Living people
20th-century Romanian mathematicians
21st-century Romanian mathematicians
20th-century American mathematicians
21st-century American mathematicians
University of Bucharest alumni
University of Michigan alumni
University of Chicago faculty
University of Illinois Chicago faculty
Northwestern University faculty
Harvard University faculty
Sloan Fellows
Fellows of the American Mathematical Society
Algebraic geometers
Romanian expatriates in the United States